|}
Christopher Dennis Lugg (born 17 May 1948) is an Australian former politician. He was the Country Liberal Party member for Nelson in the Northern Territory Legislative Assembly from 1997 to 2001. He succeeded long-serving independent Noel Padgham-Purich, who had supported another independent, Dave Tollner; he was in turn defeated by Gerry Wood in 2001.

References

1938 births
Living people
Members of the Northern Territory Legislative Assembly
Country Liberal Party members of the Northern Territory Legislative Assembly
21st-century Australian politicians